Clear Falls High School is a public high school located in League City, Texas and is part of the Clear Creek Independent School District.

The school, which serves grades 9 through 12, had its first graduating class in 2013. The school opened in 2010, and is part of the Educational Village, which is also home to Mossman Elementary and Bayside Intermediate. The school provides education to portions of League City, Pasadena, and the Bacliff CDP and all of Seabrook, El Lago, Taylor Lake Village, Kemah, and Clear Lake Shores.

The school's colors are green, black, and silver and the mascot is a Knight.

History 
Clear Falls High School opened in 2010 to incoming freshmen and sophomores that lived within the newly drawn boundary to incorporate the new school. The sophomores came from Clear Lake High School and Clear Creek High School, along with those from the other two high schools in Clear Creek Independent School District, Clear Brook and Clear Springs, that wished to take biotechnology. The freshmen came from several intermediate schools in the district, with parts of Victory Lakes and League City going to Falls, while all of Seabrook Intermediate is zoned there. The first graduating class was the Class of 2013.

Campus
The school is the largest part of the Clear Creek Educational Village, which houses grades K-12 in one facility but in independent schools; the other schools are Mossman Elementary School and Bayside Middle School.

Athletics
Clear Falls is a 6A school in the same district (24-6A) as the other four high schools within the Clear Creek Independent School District.

Sports 
Sports teams include:
Marching Band
Football 
Boys and Girls Basketball
Baseball and Softball
Boys and Girls Track 
Boys and Girls Cross-country
Boys and Girls Golf 
Boys and Girls Wrestling 
Swimming
Boys and Girls Tennis 
Girls Soccer
Boys and Girls Diving
Boys soccer
Debate
Theatre
Rifle

Fine Arts 
The school has a choir instructed by Jill Fetty (Knightsong Choir), an award winning theatre department directed by Traci Arceneaux, a marching band, an orchestra taught by Christopher Tran, and a dance team (Emeralds).

References

External links

Clear Falls High School News
 Clear Creek Independent School District

High schools in Galveston County, Texas
Greater Houston
Galveston Bay Area
Clear Creek Independent School District high schools